A disability pretender is a subculture term meaning a person who behaves as if they were disabled. It may be classified as a type of factitious disorder or as a medical fetishism.

One theory is that pretenders may be the "missing link" between devotees and wannabes, demonstrating an assumed continuum between those merely attracted to people with disabilities and those who actively wish to become disabled. Many wannabes use pretending as a way to appease the intense emotional pain related to having body integrity identity disorder.

Pretending takes a variety of forms. Some chatroom users on internet sites catering to devotees have complained that chat counterparts they assumed were female were revealed as male devotees. This form of pretending (where a devotee derives pleasure by pretending to be a disabled woman) may indicate a very broad predisposition to pretending among devotees.

Pretending includes dressing and acting in ways typical of disabled people, including making use of aids (glasses, hearing aids, braces, canes, inhalers, walking sticks, crutches, wheelchairs, mobility scooters, white canes etc.). Pretending may also take the form of a devotee persuading his or her sexual partner to play the role of a disabled person. Pretending may be practised in private, in intimacy, or in public, and may occupy surprisingly long periods. In the latter case, some pretenders hope that the disability may become permanent, such as through tissue necrosis caused by constricted blood supply.

People with this condition may refer to themselves as "transabled".

See also
Abasiophilia—the desire for people who limp and/or use leg braces, walking sticks, crutches, walkers or wheelchairs
Acrotomophilia—the desire for amputees
Andy Pipkin, a character from Little Britain, who pretends to be disabled
Apotemnophilia—sexual arousal based on the desire to be or appear as an amputee
Attraction to disability—the broad range of sexualised fascinations projected onto disabled people
Disability devotee ("dev")—one who desires disabled partners
Medical fetishism—a sexualised interest in observing medical practice and receiving medical treatment
Munchhausen's syndrome—individuals with this psychological disorder feign illness and/or self-harm
Body integrity identity disorder ("transabled")—individuals with this disorder believe they should have an impairment; sometimes seen as analogous to gender dysphoria

References

Bruno, R. L., PhD, "Devotees, pretenders and wannabes: Two cases of Factitious Disability Disorder" The Journal of Sexuality and Disability, 1997, 15, pp. 243–260
this portal to the pretender web lists 12 pretender and three pretender/wannabe websites

Abnormal psychology
Disability